The 2008 Pakistani provincial elections may refer to:

2008 Balochistan provincial election
2008 North-West Frontier Province provincial election
2008 Punjab provincial election
2008 Sindh provincial election

2008 elections in Pakistan
Provincial elections in Pakistan
2008 in Pakistani politics